is a Japanese manga artist known both for his own works as well as being the collaborative artist with manga writers such as Shou Makura and Tatsuya Hamazaki. His most notable work has been Jigoku Sensei Nūbē which has adapted into an anime series.

Works
 AT Lady! (1989–1990)
 Jigoku Sensei Nūbē (1993–1999, with Shou Makura)
 Tsurikkies Pintarou (2000, with Shou Makura)
 Magician² (2001)
 Gedou the Unidentified Mysterious Boy (2004–2005)
 Digimon Next (2006–2008, with Tatsuya Hamazaki)
 Izuna the Spiritual Medium (ongoing, with Shou Makura)

References

External links
 Takeshi Okano manga at Media Arts Database 

People from Kashiwa
Manga artists from Chiba Prefecture
Living people
1967 births
People from Chiba Prefecture